On Safari may refer to:

 On Safari (1982 game show), a 1982–1984 British children's game show set in the jungle, presented by Christopher Biggins, and produced by TVS for broadcast on ITV network
 On Safari (2000 game show), a 2000 British children's game show, presented by Richard McCourt, and produced by SMG Productions for broadcast for ITV/CITV
 On Safari (1957 TV programme), a British nature documentary television programme hosted by Armand and Michaela Denis that debuted in 1957
 On Safari (album), a 2016 album by The Kentucky Headhunters